The 1979 Avon Championships of Florida  was a women's tennis tournament played on indoor carpet courts at the Sportatorium  in Hollywood, Florida in the United States that was part of the 1979 Avon Championships circuit. It was the third and final edition of the tournament and was held from January 22 through January 28, 1979. Greer Stevens, seeded 15th, won the singles title and earned $24,000 first-prize money.

Finals

Singles
 Greer Stevens defeated  Dianne Fromholtz 6–4, 2–6, 6–4
 It was Stevens' 1st singles title of the year and the 4th of her career.

Doubles
 Tracy Austin /  Betty Stöve defeated  Rosie Casals /  Wendy Turnbull 6–2, 2–6, 6–2

Prize money

References

External links
 International Tennis Federation (ITF) tournament edition details

Avon Championships of Florida
Avon Championships
Avon Championships of Florida
Avon Championships of Florida